Dinana Island  is an island in the Louisiade Archipelago in Milne Bay Province, Papua New Guinea.

Administration 
The island is part of Sekuku Ward. it belongs to Bwanabwana Rural Local Level Government Area LLG, Samarai-Murua District, which are in Milne Bay Province.

Geography 
Dinana is located between Sideia Island and Basilaki Island. 
The island is part of the Sideia group, itself a part of Samarai Islands of the Louisiade Archipelago.

References

Islands of Milne Bay Province
Louisiade Archipelago